A World Apart may refer to:

A World Apart (TV series), a 1970–1971 daytime drama series on ABC
A World Apart (film), a 1988 anti-apartheid drama
A World Apart (book), a 1950 book on the Gulag by Gustaw Herling